The Virginia–Rainy Lake Lumber Company Office is a former office building in Virginia, Minnesota, United States.  It was built around 1907 as the headquarters for the Virginia–Rainy Lake Lumber Company, the largest lumber company in the Upper Midwest in the early 20th century.  The building was listed on the National Register of Historic Places in 1980 for its state-level significance in the theme of industry.  It was nominated for representing one of the Iron Range's few major industries aside from mining.

As of 2018 the building functions as Merritt House, an intensive residential treatment center operated by the Range Mental Health Center.  The nearby Virginia–Rainy Lake Lumber Company Manager's Residence is also on the National Register of Historic Places.

See also
 National Register of Historic Places listings in St. Louis County, Minnesota

References

1907 establishments in Minnesota
Buildings and structures in Virginia, Minnesota
Commercial buildings completed in 1907
Headquarters in the United States
Logging in the United States
National Register of Historic Places in St. Louis County, Minnesota
Office buildings on the National Register of Historic Places in Minnesota